Sergio Rodolfo Santín Spinelli (born August 6, 1956 in Salto) is a retired football striker from Uruguay, who was nicknamed "Bocha" during his professional career.

Career
Having made his official debut on July 18, 1980 against Peru (2-2), Santín obtained a total number of 18 international caps for the Uruguay national football team. He represented his native country at the 1986 FIFA World Cup, wearing the number eleven jersey.

Santín played club football for Danubio and Peñarol in Uruguay and Cúcuta Deportivo, Atletico Nacional, and América de Cali in Colombia

Santín currently works as Ricardo Gareca's assistant coach in Vélez Sársfield's coaching staff.

References

1956 births
Living people
Uruguayan footballers
Association football forwards
Uruguay international footballers
1986 FIFA World Cup players
Uruguayan Primera División players
Categoría Primera A players
Danubio F.C. players
Independiente Medellín footballers
Peñarol players
América de Cali footballers
Santos FC players
Uruguayan expatriate footballers
Expatriate footballers in Colombia
Expatriate footballers in Brazil
Uruguayan expatriate sportspeople in Colombia
Uruguayan expatriate sportspeople in Brazil
Uruguayan football managers
Once Caldas managers
Cúcuta Deportivo managers
Footballers from Salto, Uruguay